Lackadaisy (also known as Lackadaisy Cats) is a webcomic created by American artist Tracy J. Butler. Set in a Prohibition-era 1927 St. Louis with a population of anthropomorphic cats, the plot chronicles the fortunes of the Lackadaisy speakeasy after its founder is murdered. The comic mixes elements of comedy, crime and mystery. It won multiple Web Cartoonists' Choice Awards in 2007 and 2008, and in April 2011 was nominated for the Eisner Award for "Best Digital Comic".

The style of the comic is highly detailed, with elegantly attired cartoon characters that resemble styles from animated films of Walt Disney and Don Bluth. The strips are sepia-toned, resembling aged photographs of the 1920s era. Launched by Butler on July 19, 2006, the comic updates on an irregular basis, with the most recent update published in 2020.

Setting 

When prohibition grips the United States in 1920, Atlas May sets his eatery, the Little Daisy Café, as the front for a successful speakeasy called the Lackadaisy. Situated at the mouth of a network of limestone caves, the speakeasy can only be accessed from the Café by those showing a pin in the shape of a Clubs card suit. With easy access to illegal alcohol and a steady clientele, business burgeons, and the Lackadaisy becomes a premier establishment.

In 1926, however, Atlas is mysteriously killed, and management of the Little Daisy and the Lackadaisy falls to his widow Mitzi. Patronage at the Lackadaisy gradually falls off, bringing it to the brink of collapse, with only a handful of its original crew remaining and doing their best to keep the business alive. There is a band that plays at the club, and one of the members is a rumrunner, which brings the characters into conflict with others who distill their own whiskey and moonshine.

Production 

Butler creates the comic by pencil sketching original images, then scanning and adjusting them with software such as Photoshop, where the panels are then assembled. Lighting is then added in grey tones, sharpening where needed, and dialogue and sound effects are added in a separate layer. The sepia tones are added in the final pass. Some of the feline characters are based on Butler's own pets, Ivy and Calvin.

Artist biography 

Tracy Butler was born in 1980 in Springfield, Massachusetts. In high school, she would doodle and create characters while sitting in class. She studied biology for a year at Our Lady of the Elms College in Massachusetts, before returning to her art. She created a website with some of her work, which led to a job offer from Simutronics, a Missouri game development company. Butler performed illustration and graphic design work before moving into 3D character design and animation. After living in St. Louis for some time, she purchased a 100-year-old house, and began researching its history, as well as that of the local neighborhood, and ultimately the history of St. Louis itself. Combined with her interest in jazz music, and the characters she had designed in school, this led to her starting Lackadaisy in July 2006. An Italian print version was released in 2008, and an English version in 2009.

Awards 

In 2007, Lackadaisy won every award for which it was nominated in the Web Cartoonists' Choice Awards, including "Outstanding Newcomer" and "Outstanding Artist". In 2008, Lackadaisy won five Web Cartoonists' Choice Awards, including "Outstanding Artist", "Black and White Art", and "Website Design".

In 2009, the art of Lackadaisy was used on the cover of the Turkish magazine Photoshop. In 2011, Lackadaisy was nominated for an Eisner Award in the category of "Best Digital Comic", but lost to The Abominable Charles Christopher by Karl Kerschl.

Collected editions 

In 2008, the first hardcopy volume for the Lackadaisy comic was released in Italy by ReNoir Comics, .
An English version was released in 2009, published by 4th Dimension Entertainment. In a 2011 interview in Draw! magazine, Butler revealed that Volume 2 is in the works, and plans are being made for an iPhone version of the comic as well.

Legacy  

The art style of Lackadaisy has been cited as an influence on other webcomics, such as Zebra Girl by Joe England, and received a mention in the Girl Genius webcomic by Phil Foglio.

Short film adaptation 
In March 2020, it was announced that Iron Circus Comics was planning the production of an animated short film based on the webcomic, set to be directed by animator Fable Siegel. The project was crowdfunded through a Kickstarter campaign. The short film is scheduled for a March 2023 release on YouTube.

The voice cast of the film include the following:
 Michael Kovach as Rocky
 Lisa Reimold as Ivy
 Belsheber Rusape as Freckle 
 SungWon Cho as Mordecai
 Malcolm Ray as Nicodeme
 Benni Latham as Serafine 
 Bradley Gareth as Wick
 Ashe Wagner as Mitzi
 Jason Marnocha as Viktor
 Valentine Stokes as Zib

References

External links 
 Lackadaisy (Russian version)
 Tracy Butler's gallery on deviantART
 

2000s webcomics
2006 webcomic debuts
American comedy webcomics
Anthropomorphic cats
Comics about cats
Comics set in the 1920s
Fictional cats
Fiction set in 1920
Furry webcomics
Historical webcomics
Works about prohibition in the United States
Web Cartoonists' Choice Award winners